The Mexican ambassador in Harare was the official representative of the Government in Mexico City to the Government of Zimbabwe.

List of representatives

See also
 Mexico–Zimbabwe relations

References 

 
Zimbabwe
Mexico